Darkman II: The Return of Durant is a 1995 American superhero film directed by Bradford May. It is a direct-to-video sequel to the film Darkman, with series creator Sam Raimi serving as executive producer. The film stars Arnold Vosloo (replacing Liam Neeson from the first film) as Peyton Westlake/Darkman and Larry Drake reprising his role as Robert G. Durant. It was followed by the third installment in the trilogy, Darkman III: Die Darkman Die, also starring Vosloo.

Plot
Sometime after the events of the original film, scarred scientist Peyton Westlake continues to work on perfecting his synthetic skin cell formula, funding his research by stealing from the criminals he fights as the vigilante "Darkman". His synthetic skin still has a 99-minute timeframe before light causes it to break down. Robert G. Durant, Westlake's old enemy, awakens from a coma after Darkman left him for dead in their last encounter. Durant quickly reforms his old gang and helps a prisoner, Dr. Alfred Hathaway, escape custody.  Durant wants Hathaway to construct experimental particle-beam guns to sell on the black market.

Westlake, wearing a disguise and using a false name, meets and befriends a scientist named David Brinkman, who is also working on a synthetic skin formula. Brinkman has been able to break past the 99-minute photosensitivity problem of Westlake's formula. Westlake suggests the two form a partnership, to which Brinkman happily agrees. At the same time, Durant realizes that Brinkman's lab has the power requirements needed for his particle-beam weapons.  Durant sends his men to try and buy the building, but Brinkman refuses. In retaliation, Durant orders his death. Durant's men return and brutally torture Brinkman before killing him. Westlake discovers his body and notices that a finger has been cut off (Durant's calling card), causing him to realize that his old foe is still alive. 

Westlake also forms a begrudging friendship with a shot-shot reporter, Jill Randall, who is investigating Durant's possible return. However, Durant orchestrates her death, and she is killed by a car bomb after a news report on Durant's dealings.

Westlake learns that Durant is again seeking to purchase Brinkman's building, this time from his sister Laurie. He sets out to protect her from Durant, but she is captured. AWestlake uses his synthetic skin to make masks and disguise himself as Durant's men so he can find the villain's hideout. In an ensuing battle, Durant's men, Dr. Hathaway, and the buyers Durant had lined up to purchase his weapons are all killed, while Laurie is rescued. Durant attempts to flee in his car, not knowing that Westlake had already rigged it with an explosive charge. Durant is killed in the explosion, mirroring Randall's death.

Westlake later sees a news report on Randall's death. Randall became a martyr and the police found out that Durant was behind her murder. Tipping his hat to the memory of his friend, Darkman silently vows to continue working on his synthetic skin cell formula and his fight against crime and injustice.

Cast 
 Arnold Vosloo as Dr. Peyton Westlake / Darkman
 Larry Drake as Robert G. Durant
 Kim Delaney as Jill Randall
 Renee O'Connor as Laurie Brinkman
 Lawrence Dane as Dr. Alfred Hathaway
 Jesse Collins as Dr. David Brinkman
 David Ferry as Eddie Scully
 Rod Wilson as Ivan Druganov
 Jack Langedijk as Rollo Latham
 Sten Eirik as "Whitey"
 Steve Mousseau as Roy
 James Millington as Mr. Perkins
 Kevin Rushton as Skinhead
 Phillip Jarrett as Dan
 Catherine Swing as Bonnie Cisco
 Graham Rowat as Bob, The Producer
 Chris Gillett as Bob's Boss
 David Clement as Detective Stringer
 Donna Mullin as Miss S&M

Release

Home media
In 1999, the film was released on DVD, which included production notes, cast & crew bios, a trailer, and web links.

All three Darkman films were released in a box set in August 2007.

In 2014, it was re-released on DVD.

Shout! Factory released a Special Edition Blu-ray of the film in November 2017, featuring a new audio commentary with Bradford May.

Reception

Critical response
Darkman II: The Return of Durant received largely negative reviews from critics.

The review aggregation website Rotten Tomatoes reported a 29% approval rating with an average rating of 3.67/10 based on 7 reviews.

TV Guide gave the film 2/5 stars and said, "...like its eponymous character, [it] doesn't stand strong scrutiny in the light". Hock Teh of IGN gave the film 5/10 stars and criticized the feel, major plot holes, the casting of Vosloo as the title character instead of Liam Neeson (who portrayed Darkman in the first film), the acting, and the character development. Patrick Bromley of Daily Dead gave the film 2/5 stars and called it "fun, but silly".

Sequel
The film is followed by a third and final entry in the series, Darkman III: Die Darkman Die, which was released direct-to-video in 1996. The third film was originally intended to be released second, but their releases were switched.

References

External links
 
 

1995 films
American superhero films
American vigilante films
1995 science fiction films
1990s superhero films
Direct-to-video sequel films
Universal Pictures direct-to-video films
1990s vigilante films
Films directed by Bradford May
1990s English-language films
1990s American films